A business route (or business loop, business spur, or city route) in the United States is a short special route that branches off of a parent numbered highway at its beginning, then continues through the central business district of a nearby city or town, and finally reconnects with the same parent numbered highway at the business route's end.

Naming 
Business routes always have the same number as the major (parent) routes they parallel. For example, U.S. 1 Business splits off of and parallels U.S. Route 1, and Interstate 40 Business splits from and parallels Interstate 40. Typically, all business routes off of the same parent route have the same name. For example, St. Augustine business loop and Fredericksburg business loop are two of many business routes stemming off of US Route 1, all of which are marked as "U.S. 1 Business".

Business routes are usually marked with the word “BUSINESS” placed above the major route’s number or route shield. Alternatively, in some states, business routes are designated by adding the letter "B" after the parent route's number. For example, Arkansas business routes off of US 71 are marked as "US 71B". On some route shields and road signs, the word "business" is shortened to just "BUS". This abbreviation is rare and usually avoided to prevent confusion with bus routes.

Marking 

Business route signage varies depending on the type of the major route the business route branches off. Business routes paralleling U.S. and state highways usually have exactly the same shield shapes and nearly the same overall appearance as the routes they parallel, with a rectangular plate reading "BUSINESS" placed above the shield (either supplementing or replacing the directional plate, depending on the preference of the road agency). To better identify and differentiate alternate routes from the parent routes they parallel, some states, such as Maryland, opt to use green shields for business routes off of U.S. highways. In addition, Maryland uses a green shield for business routes off of state highways, replacing the state name, "MARYLAND", with the word "BUSINESS".

Interstate highway business routes use the same four-pointed shield design as regular Interstate highways, but substitute the normal red and blue layout with an all-green color scheme. Also, the word "BUSINESS" appears within the shield, at its top above the highway number, instead of "INTERSTATE", and either "LOOP" or "SPUR" may appear below the word "BUSINESS" and above the Interstate number. More information and images of signage can be found here.

On maps, business routes are typically denoted by a standard marker containing the route number and the abbreviation "BUS" (e.g., "BUS 81" inside a U.S. route shield to denote Business US 81). For Interstate business routes, an indication of whether the route is a business loop or business spur may also be included (e.g., adding "LOOP 44" inside the interstate marker). MDOT's official Michigan maps denote Interstate business routes with green shields that look similar to Interstate business route signage.

Maintenance 
Business routes are maintained by different levels of government in different states. Many states incorporate business routes into their state-maintained highway systems; others, such as Indiana and Wisconsin, have entrusted business route maintenance to local governments.

Formation 

Business routes typically follow the original routing of the numbered route through a city or town and were largely created during the era of large-scale highway construction in the U.S. from the 1930s through to the 1970s. As U.S. Highways and Interstates were built, they would typically begin in the first phase of their development with the numbered route carrying traffic directly through the center of a given city or town. In the second phase of their development, bypasses would be constructed around the central business districts of the towns they had once passed directly through. As these bypasses were built, the original sections of these routes that had once passed directly through a given city or town would often be designated as "business routes".

In many cases before the construction of such bypasses, local businesses would attempt to exert legal and/or legislative pressure for these bypasses to be routed to maximize access between their businesses and the proposed bypass loops, while state planners might attempt to route such bypasses with less concern for the welfare of the businesses being bypassed.

City routes 
City routes are most commonly found in the Midwestern United States, although there are a number of city routes in other parts of the U.S, as well. These routes serve the same purpose as business routes, but they feature "CITY" signs instead of "BUSINESS" signs above or below the route shields. The designations of many of these city routes are being phased out in favor of the business route designation.

Another definition of a "city route" is similar to a county route, where a particular city forms its own highway system, usually of beltways. The city of Pittsburgh, Pennsylvania, for instance, has a colored belt system. Officials in Charlotte, North Carolina, created Charlotte Route 4, a loop of surface streets around Uptown Charlotte. A route in Pawtucket, Rhode Island known as the Downtown Circulator, was created by the city to help travelers navigate the downtown area.

See also 
 Alternate route
 Bypass
 Special route
 List of business routes of the Interstate Highway System
 List of special routes of the United States Numbered Highway System

References 

Roads in the United States
Types of roads
Roads in Canada by type